Nicholas Confessore is a Pulitzer Prize-winning political correspondent on the National Desk of The New York Times.

Early life
Confessore grew up in New York City and attended Hunter College High School. He was a politics major at Princeton University, class of 1998.  While at Princeton, he wrote for the weekly student newspaper the Nassau Weekly.

Career
Confessore was previously an editor at the Washington Monthly and a staff writer for The American Prospect. He has also written for The New York Times Magazine, The Atlantic Monthly, Rolling Stone, the Los Angeles Times, The Boston Globe, Salon.com, and other publications. At the age of 28, he won the 2003 Livingston Award for national reporting.

He was part of a team of reporters who covered the downfall of New York governor Eliot Spitzer. He also won the 2009 Pulitzer Prize for Breaking News Reporting and the 2008 Sigma Delta Chi Award for deadline reporting  from the Society of Professional Journalists as part of the New York Times staff covering the Spitzer scandal.

He shared three Gerald Loeb Awards: the 2015 award for Beat Reporting for the story "Lobbying in America", the 2016 award for Images/Graphics/Interactives for the story "Making Data Visual", and the 2019 award for Investigative reporting for the series "Facebook, Disinformation and Privacy".

Confessore wrote several critical stories in 2018 about social networking company Facebook. He is a cousin of the Winklevoss twins.

References

External links
 

Hunter College High School alumni
Living people
Journalists from New York City
Princeton University alumni
1976 births
The New York Times people
MSNBC people
Gerald Loeb Award winners for Deadline and Beat Reporting
Gerald Loeb Award winners for Images, Graphics, Interactives, and Visuals
Gerald Loeb Award winners for Investigative
Livingston Award winners for National Reporting